Öja may refer to:

 Öja (Finland), an island in Kokkola region, Finland
 Öja, Nynäshamn, an island in the Stockholm archipelago, Sweden
 Öja, Gotland, a settlement in Sweden
 Ōja Station, a railway station in Hashikami, Japan

See also 
 Oja (disambiguation)
 OJA (disambiguation)